Michael Joseph Hewitt (born 23 October 2000) is a Scottish professional footballer who plays as a defender for Ayr United.

Career
Born in Irvine, Hewitt played youth football with Rangers and had a loan spell with Edusport Academy in 2017. Making 37 appearances in the Scottish lowland league.

After playing for their reserve side in the 2018–19 season, he signed a two-year contract with Ayr United in summer 2019. He had a spell at Kilwinning Rangers in the first half of the 2019–20 season, making 22 appearances before joining Annan Athletic on loan in January 2020. He appeared in 5 league matches for Annan Athletic. Before the league was cut short due to the corona virus pandemic.

He made his first-team debut on 6 October 2020 in a 5–2 Scottish League Cup victory away to Albion Rovers, before making his league debut for the club away to Inverness Caledonian Thistle in the Scottish Championship on 24 October. Hewitt made 8 appearances for Ayr in the 2020/2021 season. 

Hewitt was loaned to Peterhead in September 2022.

References

2000 births
Living people
Scottish footballers
Association football defenders
Caledonian Braves F.C. players
Ayr United F.C. players
Kilwinning Rangers F.C. players
Annan Athletic F.C.
Scottish Professional Football League players
Peterhead F.C. players